The El-Issa Family is an Arab Christian family that emerged from Jaffa, Palestine in the 20th century. The family is known for its "intellect, politics and literature", its members Issa El-Issa and his cousin Yousef El-Issa were the among the first who warned about the Zionist movement in Mandatory Palestine. They were also among the first to promote Palestinian nationalism through their family's numerous newspapers and journals, most notably Falastin which was established in 1909. Other examples include Al-Asma'i, Alif Bā’ and Al-Bilād. Their descendants currently reside in Middle Eastern countries or have migrated to western countries, mostly the United States.

Notable members
Hanna El-Issa: one of the first journalists in Palestine who established the journal Asmaʿi ("Listening") in 1908
Jeries El-Issa: a poet who is considered to be one of Palestine's first intellectuals 
Suleiman El-Issa: Jeries's son who is also a famous poet
Issa El-Issa: the founder of Falastin in Jaffa, Palestine, in 1909
Yousef El-Issa, Issa's cousin who also founded Falastin in 1909, he also established Alif Bā’ in Damascus, Syria
Raja El-Issa: Issa's son, who took manager position of the newspaper after his father's death, he was also the first chairman of the Jordan Press Association in Amman, Jordan, in 1956
Daoud El-Issa: Issa's nephew who also had the manager position of the newspaper, established Al-Bilād in Jerusalem in 1956 and became a member of Jordan Press Association in 1976

See also
Falastin (newspaper)
Issa (name)

References

Palestinian families